The United Voluntary Services Open was a golf tournament on the LPGA Tour, played only in 1957. It was played at the Presidio Golf Club in San Francisco, California. Wiffi Smith won the event.

References

Former LPGA Tour events
Golf in California
Sports in the San Francisco Bay Area
1957 in sports in California
Women's sports in California